The initials RBPF may refer to:

 Royal Bahamas Police Force
 Royal Brunei Police Force